"Choir" is a song by Australian singer Guy Sebastian. It was released on 31 May 2019 as the second single from Sebastian's ninth studio album T.R.U.T.H.. An official remix by Norwegian music producer Alan Walker was released on 27 September 2019.

At the ARIA Music Awards of 2019, the song was nominated for four awards; Best Male Artist, Best Pop Release, Video of the Year and Song of the Year, and won the latter two.

At the APRA Music Awards of 2020, "Choir" was nominated for Song of the Year, Most Performed Australian Work of the Year and Most Performed Pop Work of the Year.

Background
The song is dedicated to his great friend and musical collaborator Luke Liang, who died following a battle with mental health. Sebastian said "[His death] was very unexpected. In fact, I'd actually done a gig with Luke, who passed away, just before I left for LA. And I could sense that something wasn't quite right... It was very hard to process and it still is." The song was originally a ballad, but Sebastian changed it into "an upbeat, poignant song about the choir of voices Liang has joined in death, and the choir of voices "keeping his light alive" on earth."

Sebastian performed an acoustic version of the song on 60 Minutes.

Music video
The music video for "Choir" was directed by James Chappell and released on YouTube on 17 June 2019. It has over 7.8 million views as of November 2022. The remix video was also released on 27 September 2019 through Alan Walker's YouTube channel. It was filmed in a church in Newtown, a bus depot in Marrickville and Sea Cliff Bridge, Wollongong.

Track listing

Credits and personnel 
Credits adapted from Tidal.

Original version

 M-Phazes – production

Remix version

 M-Phazes – production
 Downtown Trevor Brown – production
 Guy Sebastian – production, composition, lyrics
 Zaire Koalo – production, composition, lyrics
 Miles Walker – mix engineering
 Alan Walker – remixer

Charts

Weekly charts

Year-end charts

Certifications

Release history

References

2019 songs
2019 singles
Guy Sebastian songs
Sony Music Australia singles
Songs written by Guy Sebastian
Commemoration songs
ARIA Award-winning songs